Anepsiini is a tribe of darkling beetles in the subfamily Pimeliinae of the family Tenebrionidae. There are at least four genera in Anepsiini, found in North America.

Genera
These genera belong to the tribe Anepsiini:
 Anepsius LeConte, 1851
 Batuliodes Casey, 1907
 Batuliomorpha Doyen, 1987
 Batulius Leconte, 1851

References

Further reading

 
 

Tenebrionoidea
Beetle tribes